The 1990 NCAA Division I Indoor Track and Field Championships were contested at the Hoosier Dome in Indianapolis, Indiana to determine the individual and team national champions of men's and women's NCAA collegiate indoor track and field events in the United States. These were the 26th annual men's championships and the 8th annual women's championships.

Six-time defending champions Arkansas claimed the men's team title, the Razorbacks' seventh title and the seventh of twelve straight titles.

Texas won the women's team title, the Longhorns' third team title and third in five years.

Qualification
All teams and athletes from Division I indoor track and field programs were eligible to compete for this year's individual and team titles.

Team standings 
 Note: Top 10 only
 Scoring: 6 points for a 1st-place finish in an event, 4 points for 2nd, 3 points for 3rd, 2 points for 4th, and 1 point for 5th
 (DC) = Defending Champions

Men's title
 57 teams scored at least one point

Women's title
 48 teams scored at least one point

References

NCAA Indoor Track and Field Championships
Ncaa Indoor Track And Field Championships
Ncaa Indoor Track And Field Championships